Centennial Bridge may refer to:

Canada 
 Centennial Bridge (New Brunswick), over the Miramichi River, in Northumberland County, New Brunswick, Canada

China 
 Haikou Century Bridge

Panama 
 Centennial Bridge, Panama, which crosses the Panama Canal

United States 
 Centennial Bridge (Leavenworth, Kansas), over the Missouri River, connecting Leavenworth, Kansas and Platte County, Missouri
 Centennial Bridge (Center Valley, Pennsylvania), an arch bridge in Center Valley, Pennsylvania
 Centennial Covered Bridge, a replica wooden covered bridge in Cottage Grove, Oregon
 Rock Island Centennial Bridge, connecting Rock Island, Illinois and Davenport, Iowa
 Teegarden-Centennial Covered Bridge, over Little Beaver Creek, in Columbiana County, Ohio
 Veterans Memorial Centennial Bridge, in Idaho (formerly Bennett Bay Centennial Bridge)

Windows 10 
 The codename for the application bridge used to port Win32 desktop apps to the Universal Windows Platform